Dabnik is a village in the municipality of Pomorie, in Burgas Province, in southeastern Bulgaria.

References

Villages in Burgas Province